London Derbies are the various local football derbies between the teams in London, England. It specifically refers to individual matches between the teams, but can also be used to describe the general ongoing rivalry between the clubs and fans. The first London Football League derby took place at Clapton Stadium on 11 November 1905, where Chelsea beat Clapton Orient 3–0 in a Second Division match. Chelsea also won the first top-flight London derby with a 2–1 victory over Woolwich Arsenal, in a First Division game at Stamford Bridge on 9 November 1907. As of the 2021–22 season, there are thirteen clubs in the Premier League and Football League that play in the Greater London area. Arsenal against Tottenham Hotspur and Millwall against West Ham United are ranked as two of the most ferocious London derbies.

Clubs in London

Defunct English Football League clubs based in London include Thames and Wimbledon.

Major London derbies
 North London derby – between Arsenal and Tottenham Hotspur. A rivalry has existed since Arsenal's move to the Highbury area of North London in 1913, and especially since Arsenal's promotion to the First Division in 1919. They have played each other about 200 times.
 North West London derby 
 Arsenal F.C.–Chelsea F.C. rivalry – is a more recent rivalry between North London Arsenal and West London Chelsea, which has increased in importance and intensity since Chelsea's emergence in the late 1990s. They first played each other in 1907 and have competed more than 200 games together.
Chelsea F.C.–Tottenham Hotspur F.C. rivalry – is a rivalry dating back to their first meeting in 1909, between West London Chelsea and North London Tottenham Hotspur. They've played each other just over 160 times.
 Millwall F.C.–West Ham United F.C. rivalry – is a South London vs East London derby between Millwall and West Ham United, also known as the Dockers derby due to the clubs' historical ties to the shipbuilding industry along the Thames. The fixture grew out of a rivalry between competing London dockers and remains fierce (matches have often been marred by violence and hooliganism) despite only being contested infrequently, due to the clubs most years being in separate divisions for much of their histories. The rivals have played each other 99 times, mostly before World War II. It is perhaps the bitterest of the London rivalries and there have been a number of films portraying it, most notably Green Street.
 East London derby – any between Leyton Orient, West Ham United and Dagenham & Redbridge, a fixture which, for the same reasons as the Dockers derby, rarely takes place. West Ham and Leyton Orient last met competitively in January 1987, and West Ham and Dagenham & Redbridge have never met since the latter was formed in 1992 from the merger of Redbridge Forest and Dagenham. However, Leyton Orient and Dagenham & Redbridge meet occasionally in the lower leagues. 
 South London derby – any between AFC Wimbledon, Charlton Athletic, Crystal Palace, Millwall and Sutton United. Despite Millwall's fiercest rivalry being with East Londoners West Ham United, they also have a rivalry with their neighbours Crystal Palace, and Charlton Athletic. The five teams have contested over 300 games between them.
 West London derby – any between Brentford, Chelsea, Fulham and Queens Park Rangers. The clubs of Brentford, Fulham and Queens Park Rangers share longstanding rivalries with each other. Fulham regards Chelsea as their major rivals, and Queens Park Rangers regard Chelsea as their major rivals, followed by Fulham. However, in more recent years and due to their success in the last 10–15 years, the West London rivalry has not been fully reciprocated by Chelsea fans, who typically regard the city neighbours, Arsenal, Tottenham Hotspur, West Ham United, and North West rivals, Liverpool and Manchester United as more significant rivals.

See also

 Football in London

References

 Harvey, Geoff & Vanessa Strowger Rivals: The Offbeat Guide to the 92 League Clubs, Aesculus Press Limited, 2004, 
 "Understanding London football rivalries" by Peter Watts, 8 February 2010
 "Brentford and Fulham briefly resume a rivalry", When Saturday Comes, July 2010
 "London: A Football Fan’s Heaven", SoccerWithoutLimits website, 7 July 2012
 "The English Fan", FussballinLondon website
 London football teams, Transfers-in-London website